Paul Efthemios Tsongas (February 14, 1941 – January 18, 1997) was an American politician who represented Massachusetts in the United States Senate from 1979 until 1985 and in the United States House of Representatives from 1975 until 1979. A member of the Democratic Party, he ran for president in 1992. He won eight contests during the presidential primaries, but lost the nomination to Bill Clinton, who later won the general election. Born in Lowell, Massachusetts, Tsongas graduated from Dartmouth College, Yale Law School and the Kennedy School of Government. After working for the Peace Corps and as an aide to Congressman F. Bradford Morse, Tsongas successively won election as a city councilor and county commissioner.

In 1974, he was elected to the House of Representatives representing Massachusetts's 5th congressional district, after defeating incumbent Paul W. Cronin. In 1978, he ran for senate, and defeated incumbent Republican Edward Brooke. In Congress, Tsongas established a reputation as a social liberal and fiscal conservative. Tsongas was diagnosed with non-Hodgkin lymphoma in 1983 and declined to seek re-election in 1984. He returned to politics after undergoing a successful bone marrow transplant. He experienced early success in the 1992 Democratic presidential primaries, winning the New Hampshire primary, but withdrew from the race in March 1992 and endorsed Clinton. An opponent of deficit spending, Tsongas co-founded the Concord Coalition. He died in 1997 of complications from pneumonia and non-Hodgkin lymphoma.

Early life 
Tsongas was born in Lowell, Massachusetts, along with a twin sister, Thaleia, to a once working-class family who came to own a very successful dry cleaning business in Lowell. His father, Efthemios George Tsongas, was a Greek immigrant, and his mother, Katina (née Pappas; originally Panagiotopoulos), was of Greek descent.

After graduating from Lowell High School in 1958, Tsongas attended Dartmouth College, graduating in 1962 with an A.B. in economics, then Yale Law School and the John F. Kennedy School of Government at Harvard University before settling in Lowell, Massachusetts. While at Dartmouth, Tsongas was a member of the  men's swimming team. He picked up the sport again, 27 years later, in 1986, after doctors suggested swimming as a way to rebuild his lung capacity while he was recovering from lymphoma. At a YMCA Masters meet, Tsongas once remarked, "I always used to say breaststroke was an athletic event and the butterfly was the political statement."

He served as a Peace Corps volunteer in Ethiopia from 1962 to 1964, and as Peace Corps Country Director in the West Indies from 1967 to 1968.

In 1967, Tsongas – working as an aide to Congressman F. Bradford Morse – met Niki Sauvage, who was spending the summer in Arlington, Virginia. They were married in 1969, and had three daughters: Ashley, Katina, and Molly. Niki Tsongas was a U.S. Representative from Massachusetts from 2007 to 2019.

When Tsongas ran for office, out of concern that people would pronounce the silent T in his last name, the campaign distributed bumper stickers saying "Tsenator Tsongas".

Political career
Tsongas first entered politics as a city councilor, elected to the Lowell City Council in 1969 where he served two consecutive terms. Tsongas went on to serve as a county commissioner of Middlesex County, Massachusetts. In 1974, he ran for United States House of Representatives from a district anchored by Lowell. The district had elected only three Democrats in its entire existence and had been in Republican hands continuously since 1895. However, in the massive Democratic wave of the post-Watergate election of 1974, he defeated freshman Republican Paul W. Cronin by a 21-point margin. He was reelected in 1976, becoming the first Democrat to hold the district for more than one term. Increasingly popular and well-liked in Massachusetts, in 1978 he ran for and was elected to the United States Senate, defeating incumbent Republican Edward Brooke by a 10-point margin.

In 1983, he was diagnosed with non-Hodgkin's lymphoma and in 1984 announced his retirement from the Senate. His seat went to fellow Democrat, 2004 presidential nominee and United States Secretary of State John Kerry.  After undergoing a bone marrow transplant to treat the disease in 1986 and receiving a clean bill of health from doctors in 1991, he returned to politics, running for his party's nomination for President in 1992. Until the 1992 campaign, Tsongas had never lost an election. He was the first former Peace Corps volunteer elected to the U.S. Senate (1978). (In 1974, he and Chris Dodd were the first elected to the U.S. House of Representatives.)

In October 1979, after the Senate Energy and Natural Resources Committee voted in favor of Alaska public lands legislation, President Jimmy Carter issued a statement thanking Tsongas for his leadership in strengthening the bill.

In May 1982, Tsongas was one of eight senators to vote against a $177.9 billion military authorization bill for 1983 that provided money for chemical weapons.

In July 1982, Tsongas met with Prime Minister of Israel Menachem Begin, questioning Begin over where negotiations would fit in the event that Chairman of the Palestine Liberation Organization Yasser Arafat concede Israel's right to exist along with reneging the Palestinian National Covenant over calls for Israel's abolition and replacement by a secular state. Tsongas afterward stated the meetings were distressing.

During a May 27, 1983 hearing on the legal effects of the Equal Rights Amendment, the first in over a decade on the amendment, Tsongas was questioned by Utah Senator Orrin Hatch over the measure, being described by the New York Times as "visibly shaken by the treatment Senator Hatch gave him". Tsongas delivered an opening statement and replied "That issue will be decided in the courts" in response to most questions by Hatch.

Political positions
Tsongas was generally viewed as socially liberal and fiscally conservative. He was especially known for his efforts in Congress in support of historic preservation and environmental conservation on one hand, and for his pro-business economic policies on the other.

He played a major role while in the House in the creation of Lowell National Historical Park, as well as in the establishment or expansion of a number of other National Park System areas.

He played an equally key role later in the Senate, working closely with then Interior Secretary Cecil Andrus, in successful passage of the massive Alaska National Interest Lands Conservation Act of 1980, which had been hopelessly deadlocked in the Senate since its original passed by the House in 1978.

Relative to business and economic matters, Tsongas focused in particular on the federal budget deficit, a cause he continued to champion even after his presidential primary campaign ended, by co-founding the Concord Coalition.

Tsongas was criticized on occasion by opponents as a Reaganomics-style politician, and as being closer to Republicans with regard to such issues. The Boston Herald editorialized that his political philosophy had "far more in common" with 1990s-era Republican Mitt Romney (who crossed over to vote for Tsongas in the 1992 primaries) than with traditional Massachusetts Democrats like Ted Kennedy. In the mid-1980s, he shocked many of the members of the Americans for Democratic Action by telling them that they should focus more on economic growth than wealth redistribution.

He once quipped, "If anyone thinks the words 'government' and 'efficiency' belong in the same sentence, we have counselling available."

Presidential campaign

Primaries

Described as a "long shot campaign" by the New York Times, Paul Tsongas was the first Democrat to launch a bid for the 1992 presidential election, on April 30, 1991 in his hometown of Lowell, Massachusetts. Tsongas campaign was banking heavily on early success in New Hampshire. Like many of the candidates, Tsongas ignored the 1992 contest in Iowa, which was expected to go overwhelmingly to Iowa's Senator Tom Harkin. Tsongas hoped that his New England independence and fiscal conservatism from neighboring Massachusetts would appeal to Granite Staters. He achieved recognition for the bluntness and clarity of his plan, distributing a short book titled A Call to Economic Arms, which focused on such issues as the growing federal deficit. When asked why he did not have a tax cut plan like the other candidates, Tsongas famously answered, "I'm not trying to play Santa Claus."

New Hampshire
During the early weeks of 1992 things seemed to be going Tsongas's way when one major candidate, Bill Clinton, stumbled over issues involving marital infidelity and avoidance of the military draft during the Vietnam War. But Clinton's setback proved temporary, bottoming out weeks before the New Hampshire primary so that while Tsongas won the most votes, and was declared the winner, the margin of 33.2% to 24.78% gave each candidate 9 delegates. Clinton adviser James Carville then tagged his man "the Comeback Kid" and declared his campaign back on track, leaving Tsongas, still ostensibly the front-runner, to be seen by many as the underdog heading into Super Tuesday.

After NH
Following New Hampshire, Tsongas was unable to match Clinton's fundraising. Clinton went on to win most of the Super Tuesday delegate contests. Tsongas won the primaries in Delaware, Maryland, Arizona, Washington, Utah and Massachusetts, but his campaign never recovered from Clinton's comeback.

Convention

Eventually, Tsongas pulled out of the race on 19 March 1992, and endorsed Clinton. However, a number of the Tsongas delegates continued to support the former Senator, and voted for Tsongas on the first ballot at the Convention. The roll call yielded 289 votes for Tsongas, placing him in 3rd place behind Clinton and then-former California Governor, Jerry Brown. During the convention Tsongas tried to include a platform plank calling for a delay in tax cuts or tax credits until the budget could be balanced, which was overwhelmingly defeated.

Post-Senate career

In late 1994, Tsongas briefly led an effort to establish a third party, to be led by someone with "national authority", suggesting General Colin Powell for that role. By that time, Tsongas was considered "the most popular political figure in Massachusetts".

Death and legacy
He died on January 18, 1997, at age 55 of complications from pneumonia and non-Hodgkin lymphoma. His obituary in the New York Times of January 20, 1997 states:

"Mr. Tsongas, who was hospitalized on Jan. 3 with a liver problem related to his treatments for non-Hodgkin's lymphoma, a slow-growing cancer of the lymph system, and later developed pneumonia, died at Brigham and Women's Hospital. Mr. Tsongas made his survival from cancer an issue in his Presidential campaign when he and two of his doctors, Dr. Tak Takvorian and Dr. George P. Canellos, said he had been cancer-free since a bone-marrow transplant in 1986.    
In May 1996, he underwent another transplant, getting bone marrow from his twin sister, Thaleia Schlesinger, to correct myelodysplasia, a bone-marrow disorder that can occur in people who have recovered from lymph cancer.

On January 27, 1998, the Tsongas Center in Lowell was dedicated in his honor.

In a special election held on October 16, 2007, his widow, Niki, won the Massachusetts Congressional seat that Tsongas once held.

Preservation Massachusetts, a statewide nonprofit focused on preserving Massachusetts history, has an annual Paul Tsongas Award to honor restoration workers in the state.

Electoral history

Massachusetts 5th district, 1974
 Paul Tsongas (D) - 99,518 (60.64%)
 Paul W. Cronin (R) (inc.) - 64,596 (39.36%)

Massachusetts 5th district, 1976
 Paul Tsongas (D) (inc.) - 144,217 (67.31%)
 Roger P. Durkin (D) - 70,036 (32.69%)

1978 Massachusetts United States Senate Democratic primary
 Paul Tsongas - 296,915 (35.55%)
 Paul Guzzi - 258,960 (31.01%)
 Kathleen Alioto - 161,036 (19.28%)
 Howard Phillips - 65,397 (7.83%)
 Elaine Noble - 52,464 (6.28%)
 Others - 379 (0.05%)

1978 Massachusetts United States Senate election
 Paul Tsongas (D) - 1,093,283 (55.06%)
 Edward Brooke (R) (inc.) - 890,584 (44.85%)
 Others - 1,833 (0.09%)

1992 United States Democratic presidential primaries
 Bill Clinton - 10,482,411 (52.01%)
 Jerry Brown - 4,071,232 (20.20%)
 Paul Tsongas - 3,656,010 (18.14%)
 Unpledged - 750,873 (3.73%)
 Bob Kerrey - 318,457 (1.58%)
 Tom Harkin - 280,304 (1.39%)
 Lyndon LaRouche - 154,599 (0.77%)
 Eugene McCarthy - 108,678 (0.54%)
 Charles Woods - 88,948 (0.44%)
 Larry Agran - 58,611 (0.29%)
 Ross Perot (write-in) - 54,755 (0.27%)
 Ralph Nader (write-in) - 35,935 (0.18%)
 Louis J. Stokes - 29,983 (0.15%)

See also
 1992 Democratic Party presidential primaries
 Atari Democrat

References

Further reading
 Paul Tsongas. 1984. Heading Home. New York: Knopf. .

External links

 
 Peace Corps bio. of Paul Tsongas
 Concord Coalition bio. of Paul Tsongas
 
 
 Ubben Lecture at DePauw University
 
 C-SPAN Tsongas goes Swimming
 A Look Back at an Unorthodox Presidential Campaign 25 Years Later

|-

|-

|-

1941 births
1997 deaths
American people of Greek descent
County Commissioners in Middlesex County, Massachusetts
Dartmouth College alumni
Deaths from cancer in Massachusetts
Deaths from non-Hodgkin lymphoma
Democratic Party members of the United States House of Representatives from Massachusetts
Democratic Party United States senators from Massachusetts
Deaths from pneumonia in Massachusetts
Harvard Kennedy School alumni
Massachusetts city council members
Peace Corps volunteers
Politicians from Lowell, Massachusetts
American twins
United States congressional aides
Candidates in the 1992 United States presidential election
Yale Law School alumni
20th-century American politicians
Centrism in the United States